Greg' or Gregory Harris may refer to:

Greg Harris (Ohio politician), American community organizer and congressional candidate from Cincinnati, Ohio
Greg Harris (Illinois politician) (born 1955), American politician
Greg A. Harris (born 1955), former pitcher in MLB, 1981–1995
Greg S. Harris (born 1965), president of the Rock and Roll Hall of Fame
Greg W. Harris (born 1963), former pitcher in MLB, 1988–1995
Gregory N. Harris, United States Navy admiral 
Gregory K. Harris, United States attorney nominee